Eurylomia is a genus of moths in the subfamily Arctiinae. The genus was described by Felder in 1874.

Species
 Eurylomia cordula
 Eurylomia ochreata
 Eurylomia similliforma

References

External links

Lithosiini
Moth genera